Igora Drive is a  motorsport complex in the resort of Igora near Novozhilovo, Leningrad Oblast, Russia.

On 26 June 2021, a contract was announced with the intention of moving the Russian Grand Prix from Sochi Autodrom to Igora starting on 2023 onwards. Due to Russia's invasion of Ukraine in 2022, the contract for the Grand Prix was terminated on 3 March.

Characteristics 
The complex includes ten professional tracks for oval track racing, drifting, rally-cross and motocross, and karting, as well a center for emergency management. The largest grandstand of the main circuit racing will accommodate five thousand people, and the total capacity of the circuit is fifty thousand people.

Competition 
In 2019, the complex signed an agreement with the Deutsche Tourenwagen Masters series. The contract runs for three years, with the option of a two-year extension. The first race was to be held from 29 to 31 May 2020 with W Series in support, but both races were cancelled as a result of the COVID-19 pandemic in Russia. An agreement was also signed with organisers of the FIA World Rallycross Championship to host the World RX of Russia in 2020. However, it was later removed from the schedule due to contractual issues. Igora Drive hosted the second round of the 2020 Russian Circuit Racing Series on 25 and 26 July. 

From 2023, the Formula One Russian Grand Prix was initially set to be held at this track. However, in the wake of the 2022 Russian invasion of Ukraine, the Russian Grand Prix contract was terminated and all future races cancelled.

Events

 Current

 July: Russian Circuit Racing Series
 August: Russian Endurance Challenge

Lap records 

The official fastest race lap records at the Igora Drive are listed as:

References

External links 
 
 

Sport in Leningrad Oblast
Motorsport venues in Russia
Racing circuits designed by Hermann Tilke